Green Lake may refer to:

Canada
 Green Lake (Cariboo), British Columbia
 Green Lake (Whistler), British Columbia
 Green Lake (Nova Scotia), Halifax Regional Municipality
 Green Lake (Ontario), Renfrew County
 Astrolabe Lake, formerly Green Lake, Whitewater Region, Renfrew County, Ontario
 Green Lake, Saskatchewan

New Zealand
 Green Lake (Mayor Island) (Lake Aroarotamahine), a crater lake on Mayor Island in the Bay of Plenty
 Green Lake (Raoul Island), crater lake in the Kermadec Islands
 Green Lake (Rotomahana), close to the shore of Lake Rotomahana in the Bay of Plenty Region
 Green Lake (Southland), in the Hunter Mountains
 Lake Rotokakahi, also known as Green Lake, near Rotorua in the Bay of Plenty Region

United States
Alphabetical by state
 Green Lake (Alaska), south of Sitka
 Green Lake (Bradley County, Arkansas), a lake in Bradley County, Arkansas
 Green Lake (Hawaii), a former lake on the island of Hawaii
 Green Lake (Maine), Hancock County
 Green Lake, Allegan County, Michigan
 Green Lake (Grand Traverse County, Michigan)
 Green Lake (Washtenaw County, Michigan)
 Green Lake Township, Michigan, Grand Traverse County
 Green Lake (Chisago City, Minnesota)
 Green Lake (Isanti County, Minnesota)
 Green Lake (Kandiyohi County, Minnesota)
 Green Lake Township, Kandiyohi County, Minnesota
 Green Lake (Glacier County, Montana)
 Green Lake, a lake in Granite County, Montana
 Green Lake (New York), Onondaga County
 Green Lake (Cortland County, New York)
 Green Lake (Fulton County, New York)
 Green Lake (Herkimer County, New York)
 Green Lakes State Park, Onondaga County, New York
 Green Lake (South Dakota), Lake County
 Green Lake (Texas), Calhoun County
 Green Lake (North Cascades National Park), Washington
 Green Lake (Seattle), a lake and park in north central Seattle, Washington
 Green Lake, Seattle, a neighborhood surrounding the lake
 Green Lake County, Wisconsin
 Green Lake, Wisconsin, a city in Green Lake County
 Green Lake (town), Wisconsin, a town in Green Lake County
 Green Lake (Wisconsin), a lake in Green Lake County

Elsewhere
 Green Lake (Kunming), Yunnan Province, China
 Green Lake (Sikkim), a lake near Lachen, Sikkim, India

Other uses
 Camp Green Lake, a fictional place from the book Holes

See also
 Grünsee (disambiguation), (German: green lake)
 Grüner See (disambiguation) 
 Lac Vert (disambiguation) (French: green lake)
 Lago Verde (disambiguation) (Italian and Spanish: green lake)
 Laguna Verde (disambiguation)